Prenasteridae is a family of echinoderms belonging to the order Spatangoida.

Genera:
 Agassizia Valenciennes, 1846
 Anisaster Pomel, 1886
 Antiquobrissus Szörényi, 1955
 Cagaster Nisiyama, 1968
 Eoagassizia Grant & Hertlein, 1938
 Holcopneustes Cotteau, 1889
 Peribrissus Pomel, 1869
 Prenaster Desor, 1853
 Pseudolinthia
 Tripylus Philippi, 1845

References

Spatangoida